Deniz Rakhmanova, known professionally as Deniz Reno, is a Canadian singer, songwriter, visual artist and a member of the American Recording Academy (GRAMMYs).

Reno is best known for her viral cover of Chris Isaak’s "Wicked Game" with Russian Deep House producer Anton Ishutin which went on to earn more than 19.5 million streams on YouTube, Reno’s songs has been supported by the likes of Paul Oakenfold, Above & Beyond, Marcus Schossow, Myon & Shane 54, Tiesto and others. In 2013 the track 'Higher', Reno's collaboration with Matvey Emerson was signed to Planet Love / Armada Music and became a House-Trance crossover summer hit, subsequently released on Armada Music's numerous compilations. It was also aired on ‘So You Think You Can Dance’ Paraguay and in national TV ads for Canada Philippine Fashion Week.

Reno's 2014 collaboration with Moonbeam "Memories" off their new album Atom via Black Hole Recordings has been included in the global electronic bestseller "In Search of Sunrise 13.5 Amsterdam" curated by Richard Durand and BT

In 2015 Reno took the stage at The Phoenix Concert Theatre in Toronto and Brick and Mortar Music Hall in San Francisco with Rhys Fulber's project Conjure One. She contributed her vocals to ‘Holoscenic’ and ‘Kill The Fear', from Conjure One's Billboard Charting 4th studio album Holoscenic, released in 2015 on Armada Records.

Her solo debut "Sometimes" with Lucky Sun has been included in the Armada Sunset Vol. 4 compilation.

Reno's deep house collaboration "Fool for You" has been included in the Pacha Various Artists 2018 compilation, issued by Warner Music.

In late 2017 Reno co-wrote and featured on a new Keys N Krates single "Something Wonderful", included on the CURA EP, released in February 2018 via Dim Mak Records. In 2019 the CURA EP was nominated for Dance Recording of the Year at the annual Canadian Juno Awards.

In the spring of 2018 Reno collaborated with Grammy award nominated producer Matt Lange on a techno track titled "Are You Am I", released in Los Angeles on Lange's IsoRhythm Records. On February 19, 2019 Lange and Reno released a collaborative track titled "Space Between" on Deadmau5's label Mau5trap Records.

Reno was featured in the September 2018 issue of Bali's premier luxury lifestyle print publication, Yak Magazine. where she shared details about her life, career and new projects, shot by celebrity photographer Oskar Munar. In October 2018 Reno was interviewed by Exclusive News Kazakhstan in anticipation of her upcoming EP release Narcissus. While vacationing in Bali in August 2018 Reno worked with well known Russian ballerina Valeriya Savvina on her new music video "Over" off the new EP Narcissus. The video premiered in November 2018.

The Narcissus EP was released on November 8, 2018. That same month Esquire Magazine Kazakhstan featured Deniz Reno in a six page profile titled "The Woman We Love", naming her as the first artist born in Kazakhstan to have achieved numerous releases on major international labels.

From 2015 to 2017 Deniz Reno was the front woman of Noise Revolution, a Barcelona-based Alternative Electro Rock band. Noise Revolution released its first EP titled Revelation Part 1 in April 2017. The band's remix of 'Feel Invincible' by American rockers Skillet (band) have been released on Atlantic Records / Warner Music US.

On August 4, 2020 Deniz Reno released a new album EP titled LOVERS via Taksu Records, produced by Juno Award nominee Mike Schlosser.

In the arts 

Deniz Rakhmanova has worked as a scenic painter on over 37 feature film and TV productions. Early in life she has had a successful career as a young visual artist in Central Asia, participating in over 24 group and solo shows internationally.
  She has been the recipient of several young artist achievement awards and diplomas, the most notable being presented to her at the age of 8 in the Palace of the Republic in Almaty by Kazakhstan's First Lady Sara Nazarbayeva.

Her sculpture and prop work on Suicide Squad (2016) has been included in 'Suicide Squad: Behind the Scenes with the Worst Heroes Ever' Volume by Signe Bergstrom published through Harper Collins.

In 2023 Reno appeared as a contributor in Tatler Indonesia's prestigious print magazine arts issue, writing and illustrating an article called 'Art of the Greatest Romances'.

Other projects 

In 2020, Reno founded a conscious adventure, travel and lifestyle website The Fearless Nomad, where she writes about travel, wellness, adventure, curates playlists and interviews influential personalities in the fields of entertainment, sports, art and business. The Fearless Nomad has featured interviews with well known personalities like Hollywood Director Chris Fisher , Canadian Olympian Nikkita Holder, American Chess Grandmaster Irina Krush , Actor and UNHCR Ambassador Ger Duany , and Australian BASE Wingsuit Champion Rex Pemberton . Through the Fearless Nomad initiative, Reno acts as a patron for arts and culture, having curated events for artists in Indonesia, Canada and Kazakhstan.

Personal life 

Reno is the daughter of sculptor Vagif Rakhmanov and Canadian film industry scenic artist and sculptor Marina Reshetnikova, whose work has been featured in Academy Award and BAFTA winning and nominated films like Nightmare Alley and The Shape of Water. Reno is the youngest niece of Azerbaijani painter Maral Rahmanzadeh.

In 2016 Reno was engaged to Canadian BASE wingsuit proximity flyer and skydiver Graham Dickinson. Dickinson tragically died in a failed wingsuit BASE flight attempt in the Tianmen Mountains, China on January 25, 2017.

Charity work 

During the August 2018 earthquakes in Lombok, Indonesia, Reno helped organize community efforts in delivering relief supplies for the victims of the natural disaster.

During the 2020 COVID-19 pandemic in Indonesia, Deniz Reno volunteered for Scholars Of Sustenance Indonesia (SOS Indonesia) - A Global Food Rescue Foundation.

Reno has been a longtime patron of the arts and has curated exhibits and fundraisers showcasing young local Indonesian and international talent.

The Diana Award, a UK organization established in the memory of Diana, Princess of Wales which honours young people for their social action and humanitarian work, named Reno one of the judges on their 2022 and 2023 season panel.

Discography

EPs
 That Girl (2012)
 Bang Boom (2015)
 Devil In My Head (2015)
 Sometimes/Blue Eyes (2017)
 Fly (2018)
 Narcissus (2018)
 Lovers (2020)
 Acoustic Memoir (2021)

Singles
 Rock My Body (2011)
 That Girl (2012)
 Let Me Know (2012)
 Blame It On Me (2012)
 Higher feat. Matvey Emerson (2013)
 Bang Boom (2015) 
 Lovecrime (2015)
 Memories (prod. Moonbeam) (2015)
 Devil In My Head (2015)
 Trouble (2015)
 Wicked Games (2015)
 Love No More (2015)
 Remember (2015)
 Gravity (2016)
 Sobriety (2016)
 Waiting (2016)
 Anaklia's Dream (2016)
 I Got You (2016)
 Sometimes (2017)
 Blue Eyes (2017)
 Fool For You (2017)
 Are You Am I (produced by Matt Lange) (2018)
 Something Wonderful (produced by Keys N Krates)  (2018)
 Fly (2018)
 Over (2018)
 Fools Rush In (2018)
 Selfish (2018)
 Miles Away (2018)
 Space Between (produced by Matt Lange) (2019)
 Brightest (2020)
 Forbidden Fruit (2020)
 Lovers (Crash & Burn) (2020)
 Siren's Song (2020)
 Pirates (2020)
 Running Through My Veins (produced by Matt Lange) (2020)
 Lost In Translation (2021)
 Father (2021)
 Stars (2021)
 Faithless (2021)
 Tattoo (2021)
 Ordinary Love (produced by Matt Lange) (2022)
 Satellite Heart (produced by Matt Lange) (2022)
 Nowhere Else (produced by Matt Lange) (2023)

Albums
 Sometimes/Blue Eyes (2017)
 Fly (2018)
 Narcissus (2018)
 Lovers (2020)
 Acoustic Memoir (2021)

References

1994 births
Living people
Canadian soul singers
Canadian pop singers
21st-century Canadian women singers